Chorny is a surname derived from East Slavic word meaning "black" (Чёрный/Чорний/Чорны). It may refer to:
Daniel Chorny
Dmitri Chorny
Hryhoriy Chorny
Mikhail Chorny 
Glen Chorny 
Sasha Chorny (1880–1932), Russian poet
Joseph Judah Chorny

See also
 
Chyorny (disambiguation)

Russian-language surnames
Ukrainian-language surnames